Hsenwi Township, also known as Hseni, is a township of Lashio  District in the Shan State of eastern Burma. It shares the borders with Kutkai Township in the north, Kunlong Township in the east, Lashio Township in the south and Namtu Township in the west. There are 4 wards and 32 village-tracts. Total population was about 50,000 in 2009.

Description
Namtu, Namle and Namsalat are main creeks and they stream from east to west. The principal town is Hsenwi.

Teak, chestnut, sweet chestnut, lacquer trees, Cassia siamea, magnolia, mango, jack fruit, guava trees, bananas, lychee, green tea and oranges are grown. Paddy, corn, soya bean, ground nut, pigeon peas, sesame, belleric myrobalan, sunflower, rubber, sugarcane, chili, potato and coffee are also grown. Buffalo, cow, pig, chicken, fish were breed in the township.

There are 1 high school, 4 high school branches, 1 middle school, 7 post primary schools and 50 primary schools. 

There are 1 25-bedded hospital, 2 16-bedded hospitals, 3 rural health clinics and 12 rural health clinics (branches). One of 16-bedded hospitals is in Sanlaung Village. It has been commissioned since October 2004.

References

Townships of Shan State